Lago di San Giuliano is a lake in the Basilicata region of southern Italy. The lake is located entirely within the province of Matera. It is southwest of Matera, east of Grottole, and north of Miglionico. The Bradano flows into the lake from the northwest and flows out of the lake to the southeast.

References

Lakes of Basilicata
Ramsar sites in Italy